David Bates may refer to:

 David Bates (English artist) (1840–1921), English landscape artist
 David Bates (American artist) (born 1952), American modernist artist
 David Bates (footballer) (born 1996), Scottish footballer
 David Bates (historian) (born 1945), British historian and writer
 David Bates (physicist) (1916–1994),  Northern Irish mathematician and physicist
 David Bates (poet) (1809–1870), American poet
 David Bates (rugby league) (born 1980), Irish rugby league footballer
 David Bates (swimmer) (born 1976), Australian open water swimmer
 David Bates (politician) (1941–2017), American politician
 David W. Bates (born 1957), American-born physician, biomedical informatician and professor